The Isle of MTV is an annual music festival organized by MTV Europe, which is part of Viacom Media Networks. It has been held in Malta since 2007 while previous editions were held in Portugal, France, Spain and Italy. The Isle of MTV is one of the smallest music festivals in Europe, and the latest editions were attended by approximately 10,000 people.

The festival is organized annually on one day in June or July. It begins at 18:00 and ends before midnight. Entrance is free of charge, and there are no age limits. Malta Public Transport runs special bus routes on the day to facilitate travel.

By year

2002
The 2002 edition was held at Belém Tower near Lisbon, Portugal. The line-up was as follows:
Gorillaz
Morcheeba
Rui da Silva
Rui Vargas
Erick Morillo
Roger Sanchez
Da Weasel
Layo & Bushwacka!
Kelis

2003
The 2003 edition was held at Île Gaou in Six-Fours-les-Plages, France.

2004
The 2004 edition was held at Platja Gran in Tossa de Mar on the Costa Brava, Spain. The line-up was as follows:

The Black Eyed Peas
Ali B
Amp Fiddler
Audio Bullys
Ca$h Money
Chris Coco
Ewan Pearson
Fergie
Gogo DJ
James Zabiela
Josh Wink
Kenny "Dope" Gonzalez
Mark Farina
Mark Ronson
Masters at Work
Mr. C
Mutiny
The Pinker Tones
Rob da Bank
Sander Kleinenberg
Scratch Perverts
Stanton Warriors
Todd Terry
Tim Deluxe
Way Out West
Yousef

2005
The 2005 edition was held on 14 July at Piazza Unità d'Italia in Trieste, Italy. The line-up was as follows:
Chemical Brothers
Garbage
Snoop Dogg
Meg

2007
The 2007 edition was held on 26 July at the Granaries in Floriana, Malta. The line-up was as follows:
Akon
Maroon 5
Enrique Iglesias
Ira Losco

2008
The 2008 edition was held on 25 June at the Granaries in Floriana. The line-up was as follows:
Lady Gaga
Enrique Iglesias 
OneRepublic
N.E.R.D
The Kooks

2009
The 2009 edition was held on 8 July at the Granaries in Floriana. The line-up was as follows:
Lady Gaga
The Black Eyed Peas
Metro Station
Esmée Denters

2010
The 2010 edition was held on 30 June at the Granaries in Floriana. The line-up was as follows:
David Guetta
Scissor Sisters
Kid Rock
Kelis

2011
The 2011 edition was held on 30 June at the Granaries in Floriana. The line-up was as follows:
Snoop Dogg
LMFAO
Far East Movement
Parade

2012

The 2012 edition was held on 26 June at the Granaries in Floriana. The line-up was as follows:
will.i.am
Nelly Furtado
Flo Rida
Eva Simons

2013
The 2013 edition was held on 26 June at the Granaries in Floriana. The line-up was as follows:
Jessie J
Rita Ora
Afrojack
Rudimental

2014
The 2014 edition was held on 25 June at the Granaries in Floriana. The line-up was as follows:
Hardwell
Enrique Iglesias
Nicole Scherzinger 
Dizzee Rascal
Kiesza
Tenishia

2015
The 2015 edition was held on 7 July at the Granaries in Floriana. The line-up was as follows:
Martin Garrix
Jason Derulo
Echosmith
Tori Kelly
OMI

2016

The 2016 edition was held on 28 June at the Granaries in Floriana. The line-up was as follows:
Wiz Khalifa
Jess Glynne
Steve Aoki
Clean Bandit

2017
The 2017 edition was held on 27 June at the Granaries in Floriana. The line-up was as follows:
Raye
Jonas Blue
DNCE
The Chainsmokers

2018
The 2018 Isle of MTV edition took place at the granaries in Floriana with the following musicians:
Jason Derulo
Dimitri Vegas & Like Mike
Hailee Steinfeld
Sigala
Paloma Faith 
Ella Eyre

2019
The 2019 Isle of MTV was held on 9 to 14 July.
 Martin Garrix
 Bebe Rexha
 Ava Max
 Wiley

2020
An Isle of MTV event is not to be held in 2020 due to a number of factors including COVID-19.

2021
An Isle of MTV event is not to be held in 2021 due to a number of factors including COVID-19.

2022
The 2022 Isle of MTV was held on 19 to 24 July. Following artists were Headliners:

 Marshmello

 French Montana

 bbno$

 Mae Muller

 Shaun Farrugia

References

External links

Official website

MTV
Music festivals established in 2002
2007 establishments in Malta
Electronic music festivals in Portugal
Electronic music festivals in France
Electronic music festivals in Spain
Electronic music festivals in Italy
Music festivals in Malta
Floriana
Annual events in Malta
June events
July events
Pop music festivals
Free festivals
Summer events in Malta